Saawan Kumar Tak (9 August 1936 – 25 August 2022) was an Indian film director, producer, and lyricist. He directed many Hindi films, including successful films like Saajan Bina Suhagan, Souten, Souten Ki Beti, Sanam Bewafa, Bewaffa Se Waffa. He is credited with giving break to actors such as Sanjeev Kumar and Mehmood Junior. His most famous directorial venture was Rajesh Khanna starrer Souten, which was the first Indian film to be shot in Mauritius and was a platinum jubilee hit.

Saawan Kumar began his career as the producer of the 1967 Sanjeev Kumar starrer film Naunihal. He was the one who gave the name Sanjeev to actor Haribhai Jariwala. The film received the Presidential mention at the National Awards. His directorial debut was with the film Gomti Ke Kinare (1972), which was Meena Kumari's last film, and released posthumously. He was also a prolific lyricist and has written songs for most of his produced and directed films. Apart from this, he has written the lyrics of songs for movies produced and directed by other film-makers. Among these are "Sabak", the 1973 movie starring Shatrughan Sinha and Poonam and featuring the popular song "Barkha Rani Zara Jamke Barso". He penned some songs from the film Kaho Naa... Pyaar Hai and all the songs from the 2004 film Dev.
He has also written lyrics of some very popular songs of his own movies such as "Zindagi Pyar Ka Geet Hai" Souten, "Hum Bhool Gaye" Souten Ki Beti, "Yeh Dil Bewafa Se Wafa" Bewaffa Se Waffa all sung by Lata Mangeshkar. He was married to music director Usha Khanna.

Filmography
as Director
2006 Saawan
2003 Dil Pardesi Ho Gayaa
1999 Mother
1997 Salma Pe Dil Aa Gaya
1995 Sanam Harjai
1994 Chaand Kaa Tukdaa
1993 Khal-Naaikaa
1992 Bewaffa Se Waffa
1991 Sanam Bewafa
1989 Souten Ki Beti
1987 Pyar Ki Jeet
1986 Preeti
1984 Laila
1983 Souten
1981 Saajan Ki Saheli
1980 Oh Bewafa
1978 Saajan Bina Suhagan
1977 Ab Kya Hoga
1974 Hawas
1972 Gomti Ke Kinare

References

External links
 Saawan Kumar's Official Website
 

1936 births
2022 deaths
20th-century Indian film directors
Artists from Jaipur
Hindi-language film directors
Film producers from Rajasthan
Indian lyricists
Hindi film producers
Film directors from Rajasthan